SouthEast LeatherFest (SELF) is an annual adult fetish event  for the BDSM, leather, and kink communities based in the United States' Southeast and centered in Georgia with regional and smaller related events held throughout the year.

History
SELF was started in 1995 by Jack Stice, International Master 1995. It was concepted as a BDSM, Master/slave event to welcome all sections of the SM communities, highlighting on the Leather.  Modeled after International Mister Leather and Drummer (now International Leather Sir and boy) SELF added classes to this model.  Since 1995 has been one of the largest sex education and BDSM education events in the south east region of the United States openly supporting underground kink, fetish, Master/slave, and Dominant/submission communities. Southeast Leatherfest (SELF) holds classes given by nationally known educators from across the country, holds a spokesperson contest, and has various other activities for that promote community and pride. SELF was held during the second weekend in June every year until its eighteenth year. The event now occurs on the third weekend in June.  SELF spokesperson titles are referred to as Mr. Southeast Leatherfest, Ms. Southeast Leatherfest, Southeast Leatherfest boy, Southeast Bootblack, and SouthEast Master/slave, and in the past it was the home of the International Master and slave contest until 2001. 

This event for the first time in Atlanta history brought together the straight and LGBT communities.  They worked together which had not previously happened at BDSM and Master/slave events in the area. While there had been events in the region for gay men, this was the first event to have all communities present.  SELF is a charitable event that has donated approximately $80,000 to charities over the years.  Some of these charities are the National Coalition for Sexual Freedom, Susan G. Komen for the Cure, and many more. Jack Stice was the founder of this event and the "Jack Stice Memorial Community Service Award" was given in his honor annually.

SELF started mini-grant program in 2007 which is a new program to invest regional money into local groups by funding speakers and educators to be brought to local communities that might not be able to afford it otherwise. This program was closed in 2011.

SELF has been nominated for "Pantheon of Leather Large Event of the Year" in (2005 - 2007) which means that this event has stood out from the other 100 events though independent peer review to be noted as one of five events that has been providing outstanding community service.  

In 2014, SELF was the first leather contest in the country where a portion of each title contest was digital voting by the weekend participants.  

SELF has been reviewed and has supported the Leather Archives and Museum, a library/museum/archives pertaining to Leather sub culture, fetishism, Sadomasochism, and alternative sexual practices. The geographic collection scope is worldwide and includes all sexual orientations and genders. SouthEast LeatherFest is owned and produced by Catherine Gross. It is administered by a board of volunteers annually.

Current Titlholders : 2022 
 Mr SouthEast Leather Fest -- Max
 Ms SouthEast Leather Fest -- Ms. Mia Rose
 Southeast BootBlack -- Apollo
 SouthEast Master/slave -- Master Varii and slave neill

Past Titleholders

2019-2021
 Ms SouthEast Leather Fest -- Choc Trei [stepped down on December 31, 2020]
 Southeast BootBlack -- Mycalyne
 SouthEast Person of Color -- Idris Dior
 SouthEast Leather Fest boy -- Quazi
 SouthEast Master/slave -- Sir Luke and His victor

2018
Mr SouthEast Leather Fest -- Sir Bradford
Ms SouthEast Leather Fest -- Choc Trei
SouthEast BootBlack -- Tidbit
SouthEast Person of Leather -- 
SouthEast Leather boy -- Quazi
SouthEast Master/slave -- Master Blue and slave Sheri

2017
 Ms SouthEast Leather Fest -- Tig
 SouthEast BootBlack -- Coco
 SouthEast Person of Leather -- ABizzy
SouthEast Master/slave -- Master IceDog and slave Ravyn

2016
 Ms SouthEast Leather Fest -- Tig
 Mr SouthEast Leather Fest -- Timothy Lee
 Southeast BootBlack -- Ms Tori
 SouthEast Person of Leather -- ABizzy
 SouthEast Master/slave -- Master Bella and slave Rooks

2015
 Ms SouthEast Leather Fest -- Jennifer Deese
 Mr SouthEast Leather Fest -- Timothy Lee
 Southeast BootBlack -- Friday
 SouthEast Person of Leather -- Autumn East

2014
 Ms SouthEast Leather Fest -- slave Pat
 Southeast Master/slave -- Kevin & slave

2013
 Mr SouthEast Leather Fest -- Optimus
 Ms SouthEast Leather Fest -- Flossie
 SE BootBlack -- Madeline Sparkles
 SouthEast Leather Fest boy- boy River

2012
 Mr SouthEast Leather Fest -- OB
 SouthEast Leather Fest boy -- boy Andy

2011
 Mr SouthEast Leather Fest -- Ejay
 Ms SouthEast Leather Fest -- Angel Propps
 SE BootBlack -- boy Dave
 SE Master/slave -- Master Dan and slave Melissa

2010
 Mr SouthEast Leather Fest -- Phantom Blue
 Ms SouthEast Leather Fest -- Amber
 SE BootBlack -- Margaret
 SE Master/slave -- Master Rick and slave Gypsie

2009
 Mr SouthEast Leather Fest -- Nefarious
 Ms SouthEast Leather Fest -- Miss Rae
 SE BootBlack -- Margaret
 SE Master/slave -- Master Tom and slave Linda

2008
 Mr SouthEast Leather Fest -- Henry Loyd
 Ms SouthEast Leather Fest -- Miss Bettie
 SE BootBlack -- Girl Commando/boy Andy

2007
 Ms SouthEast Leather Fest -- Solitaire
 SouthEast BootBlack - Q
 SouthEast Master/slave -- Sir Top and slave Bonnie

2006
 International Master/slave -- Mistress Suzan and slave Ziggy
 Ms SouthEast Leather Fest -- Solitaire
 Mr SouthEast Leather Fest -- Matthew Cary

2005
 SouthEast Master/slave -- Master Tom and slave Linda
 SouthEast LeatherFest Boy -- Boy Tala

2004
 Ms SouthEast Leather Fest -- Girl Kim
 SouthEast Leather Fest Boy -- Grant Lam

2003
 SouthEast Leather Sir -- Richard Gray
 SouthEast Leatherboy -- Michael Waugh
 Ms Leather Pride -- JD

2002
 International Master/slave -- Master Scott and 
 Ms Leather Pride -- Chance
 SouthEast Leather Sir -- John Derrek
 SouthEast Leatherboy -- John Mark

2001
 International Master/slave -- Master Jim and slave Marshal
 SouthEast Mr Drummer -- Daryl Fox
 SouthEast Drummer Boy -- Paul Ferreira
 Ms Leather Pride  -- Chance

2000
 International Master/slave -- Steve Sampson and Kirk
 SouthEast Mr Drummer -- Larry Cottrill
 SouthEast Drummer Boy -- Bruce Tidwell
 Ms Leather Pride -- Samantha Claar

1999
 International Master/slave -- Khiki Cavannarro and Samantha
 Ms Leather Pride -- Paula Smith
 SouthEast Mr Drummer -- Shawn Couch
 SouthEast Drummer boy -- Boy Chris

1998
 Ms Leather Pride -- Sybil King
 SouthEast Mr Drummer -- Tom Stice
 SouthEast Drummer boy -- Gregory Kornman

1997
 SouthEast Mr Drummer-- Martin Ellis
 Ms Leather Pride -- Victoria Gayton (Ameritus Award)
 SouthEast Drummer boy -- Boy Von Sumrall
 Mr. Georgia Leather -- Joseph Blair
 Ms. Georgia Leather -- Miss Patt

1996
 SouthEast Mr Drummer -- Bob Jacobs Harris
 SouthEast Drummer boy -- Rory Teasdale
 Mr. Georgia Leather -- Leonard Sewell
 Ms. Georgia Leather -- Khiki Cavannarro

1995
 SouthEast Mr Drummer -- Ricardo A M Ware
 SouthEast Drummer boy -- Patrick Langone

1994
 SouthEast Mr Drummer -- Kevin Drewery
 SouthEast Drummer boy -- Dale Calloway

1993
 Mr. SouthEast Leather -- Darryl Flick
 Mr. SouthEast Drummer -- Barry Bishop
 SouthEast Drummer boy -- Owen Griswold

1992
 Mr. SouthEast Leather -- Kevin Drewery
 Mr. SouthEast Drummer -- Bart Girton
 SouthEast Drummer boy -- Eric Hayes

1991
 Mr. SouthEast Leather -- Wes Decker
 Ms. SouthEast Leather -- MP Breslin
 Mr. SouthEast Drummer -- Vance Reger

1990
 Mr. SouthEast Leather -- Chuck Higgins
 Ms. SouthEast Leather -- Diane Suissa
 Mr. SouthEast Drummer -- Bernhard Zinkgraf 
 SouthEast Drummer boy -- Michael Feinstein

References

External links
Southeast Leatherfest
Verboten Magazine
Interview with Producer Catherine Gross SELF 2014 Leatherati.com reporting
Catherine Gross on KinkyCast.com for SouthEast LeatherFest Special Edition
 Southeast conference of clubs origin of Southeast Leatherfest
Article on the ground breaking changes at SELF 2014
2014 Judges Announced
Post-Contest 2012 in Leatherati.com
SouthEast LeatherFest 2012
Leather Archives and Museum Review
Damron Calendar of events
2007 list of judges
Leatherati Article 2012 event

BDSM organizations
LGBT events in Georgia (U.S. state)